Walter Edward Masterson III (June 22, 1920 – April 5, 2008) was an American right-handed pitcher in Major League Baseball who played for the Washington Senators, Boston Red Sox and Detroit Tigers. He started the 1948 Major League Baseball All-Star Game for the American League.

Born in Philadelphia, Masterson attended Northeast Catholic High School and signed with the Senators at age 17.

In 14 MLB seasons, he had a 78–100 win-loss record, 399 games (184 started), 70 complete games, 15 shutouts, 115 games finished, 20 saves, 1,649⅔ innings pitched, 1,613 hits allowed, 888 runs allowed, 760 earned runs allowed, 101 home runs allowed, 886 walks allowed, 815 strikeouts, 28 hit batsmen, 33 wild pitches, 7,281 batters faced, 1 balk, a 4.15 earned run average and a 1.515 WHIP. He missed the 1943 and 1944 seasons while serving in the Navy from September 1942 to July 1945 during World War II, serving on submarines in the Pacific. He later served as a pitching coach for the Texas Rangers in 1972 under manager Ted Williams. Masterson later served as baseball coach at George Mason University in 1980–81. 

He died of a stroke at age 87 at Duke University Hospital in Durham, North Carolina.

References

External links

BaseballLibrary – profile and career highlights

1920 births
2008 deaths
American League All-Stars
Baseball players from Philadelphia
Boston Red Sox players
Charlotte Hornets (baseball) players
Detroit Tigers players
George Mason Patriots baseball coaches
Major League Baseball pitchers
San Francisco Seals (baseball) players
United States Navy personnel of World War II
United States Navy sailors
Washington Senators (1901–1960) players